Gretchen (literal translation: "Little Grete" or "Little Greta") is a female given name of German origin that is mainly prevalent in the United States.

Its popularity increased because a major character in Goethe's Faust (1808) has this name. The question is usually inconvenient to the questioned since he or she shall confess to something crucial he or she was intentionally or unintentionally vague about before.

In German-speaking countries, Gretchen is not a common stand-alone given name but rather a colloquial diminutive form of Grete (Greta), which itself is a short form of Margarete. It fell out of use when the popularity of the latter two names declined in the 20th century.

People
Gretchen (singer) (born 1959), Brazilian singer
Gretchen Abaniel (born 1985), Filipino professional boxer
Gretchen Albrecht (born 1943), New Zealand painter
Gretchen Barretto (born 1970), Filipina actress
Gretchen Bleiler (born 1981), professional halfpipe snowboarder and pioneer
Gretchen J. Berg (born 1971), an American TV writer/producer
Gretchen Brewin (born 1938), Canadian politician
Gretchen Carlson (born 1966), former Miss America and current TV host
Gretchen Corbett (born 1947), American actress
Gretchen Cryer (born 1935), American writer, actress, and lyricist
Gretchen Driskell (born 1958), American politician, a former member of the Michigan House of Representatives, and candidate for Michigan's 7th congressional district in 2016.
Gretchen Dutschke-Klotz (born 1942) German-American author and former activist
Gretchen Dykstra (born 1948), previous President and CEO of the World Trade Center Memorial Foundation
Gretchen Egolf (born 1973), American actress
Gretchen Franklin (1911–2005), English actress
Gretchen Fraser (1919–1994), American alpine skier
Gretchen Fullido (born 1984), Filipina news anchor and model
Gretchen Gierach (21st century), American epidemiologist
Gretchen Hofmann (21st century), professor at the University of California
Gretchen Keppel-Aleks (21st century), an American climate scientist
Gretchen Kirby (21st century), American educator
Gretchen Lieberum (21st century), American singer
Gretchen Magers (born 1964), a former professional tennis player
Gretchen Malalad (born 1980), Filipina 2005 Southeast Asian Games karate gold medalist
Gretchen Massey (born 1969), radio host and performer
Gretchen McCulloch, Canadian linguist
Gretchen Merrill (1925–1965), American figure skater
Gretchen Mol (born 1972), American actress
Gretchen Morgenson (born 1956), Pulitzer Prize-winning journalist
Gretchen Oehler (1943–2001), American actress
Gretchen Osgood Warren (1868–1961), actress, singer, poet, and muse
Gretchen Parlato (born 1976), American jazz singer
Gretchen Passantino (1953–2014), Christian apologist
Gretchen Peters (born 1957), American country singer
Gretchen Phillips (born 1963), American musician
Gretchen Polhemus (born 1965), the 38th Miss USA
Gretchen Quintana (born 1984), Cuban heptathlete
Gretchen Rau (1939–2006), professional property master, set decorator, and art director
Gretchen Ritter (21st century), American academic administrator
Gretchen Rubin (born 1965), American author and attorney
Gretchen Ulion (born 1972), American ice hockey player
Gretchen Whitmer (born 1971), 49th Governor of Michigan and former Michigan State Senator 
Gretchen Wilson (born 1973), Grammy award-winning American country music singer-songwriter
Gretchen Wyler (1932–2007), American actress

Fictional characters
Gretchen, a fictional character played by Ivonne Mai in the 2019 film The Last Faust
Gretchen, a fictional character from Faust: The First Part of the Tragedy
Gretchen Morgan, fictional character from Prison Break
Gretchen Berg, fictional character from Heroes
Gretchen, a fictional character played by Eden Sher in Weeds
Gretchen Cutler, a fictional character from You're the Worst
Gretchen Ross, a fictional character from Donnie Darko
Gretchen Witter, a fictional character from Dawson's Creek
Gretchen, a fictional character from Phineas and Ferb
Gretchen Grundler, one of six main characters in Recess
Gretchen Schwartz, fictional character played by Jessica Hecht in Breaking Bad
Gretchen Wieners, a fictional character played by Lacey Chabert in Mean Girls
Gretchen, a fictional character from Invader Zim
Gretchen Mannkusser, fictional character from Malcolm in the Middle
Gretchen, a fictional character from Donald Fagen's song: The Goodbye Look, on his album The Nightfly
Gretchen, a fictional character from Camp Lazlo
Gretchen, a fictional character from Camp Lakebottom
Gretchen Grimlock, the antagonist in Cryptids Island on the online game Poptropica.
Kriemhild Gretchen, the witch form of Madoka Kaname, a fictional character from Puella Magi Madoka Magica
Gretchen Bodinski, a fictional character from Suits
Greedy Gretchen, a character who appeared in episodes of the TV sitcoms Three's Company and Three's a Crowd
Gretchen, a character in James A. Michener's novel The Drifters
Gretchen, a character in George Tabori's farce stage-adaptation of Hitler's Mein Kampf
Gretchen, a fictional character from Zombillenium
Gretchen Klein, a character in The Wilds (TV series)

Fictional creatures
Gretchen, a fictional dog in Dark (TV series)

References

Feminine given names
Given names derived from gemstones